Hannah White Log House is a historic home located in West Whiteland Township, Chester County, Pennsylvania.The original land owner was John Willday (1768-1795). The house was built in 1795, and is a two-story, three bay, red oak log structure with a full basement. The logs are covered with stucco.

It was listed on the National Register of Historic Places in 1984.

References

Houses on the National Register of Historic Places in Pennsylvania
Houses completed in 1800
Houses in Chester County, Pennsylvania
National Register of Historic Places in Chester County, Pennsylvania